The Eastern Shore Baseball League was a class D minor league baseball league that operated on the Delmarva Peninsula for parts of three different decades.  The league's first season was in 1922 and the last was in 1949, although the years were not consecutive, and featured teams from Maryland, Delaware, and Virginia.  The first incarnation lasted from 1922 to mid-1928 (disbanded in July), the second from 1937–41, and the third from 1946–49. Though the level of play was competitive and many future major leaguers gained experience in the ESBL, funding the league remained a constant problem for the rural franchises.

Future major leaguers who played in the ESBL include notables such as: Frank "Home Run" Baker, Mickey Cochrane, Jimmie Foxx, Mickey Vernon, and Don Zimmer.

The Eastern Shore Baseball Hall of Fame at Arthur W. Perdue Stadium in Salisbury, Maryland, pays homage to ESBL players and locals who made the major leagues. Perdue Stadium is the home of the class A Delmarva Shorebirds, an Orioles farm team.

History

Founding
The class D "Eastern Shore League" was started in 1922 using teams from the pre-existing Eastern Shore League, a group which had been playing baseball since the 1890's. The first meeting of the class D league was held on October 8, 1921 in Salisbury, Maryland where it was decided that the seven teams that completed the 1921 season would be joined by an eighth team for the 1922 season. The seven teams that completed the 1921 season were Cambridge, Crisfield, Laurel, Pocomoke City, Princess Anne, Salisbury, and Snow Hill. Four towns attended the meeting to seek expansion teams; Dover and Milford in Delaware, Berlin in Maryland, and Parksley in Virginia. Dover and Milford withdrew their request after it was decided that only one new team would be added for 1922. The Parksley team was nominated by Pocomoke City and the Berlin team by Snow Hill, with Berlin winning the vote 4 to 3. At this meeting, a $1,750 a month salary limit was put in place and it was decided to divide gate receipts 50/50 with a guarantee of at least $60 per game. It was also announced that three town, Berlin, Cambridge, and Princess Anne, would build new ballparks.

The Board of Directors met on October 22, 1921 and elected Walter B. Miller of Salisbury as the first President of the league. It was decided upon a 70-game schedule, five games at home and five games on the road, versus each team in the league for the 1922 season, with the final day being Labor Day. A general admission fee of 40 cents, including war tax, was set, and it was decided that each team should post an $875 guarantee by March 1, 1922 in order to assure the team would finish out the season. At this point, it was decided that having three teams in Worcester County would be too many. The director for each of the three teams, Berlin, Pocomoke City, and Snow Hill, volunteered for their team to withdraw. A vote was held and Snow Hill was eliminated, with the opening for the eighth team in the inaugural season being offered to Parksley, Virginia. 

A meeting of Snow Hill residents was held shortly after where resolutions were passed protesting Snow Hill's removal from the league and it was reported that President Miller would call the Board of Directors back together to reconsider Snow Hill's removal. By early November, it was reported that the residents of Snow Hill were so angered by their team being removed from the 1922 season, there was concern of it affecting elections in Worcester County that fall, as Snow Hill residents stated they would not support any candidate from Pocomoke City due to the Pocomoke City delegation not supporting Snow Hill to remain in the league. This was refuted later, stating it was merely the opinion of a few young men in the heat of anger and the story had been spread to affect the election.

In mid-November, President Miller announced that the Eastern Shore League was admitted by the National Association of Professional Baseball Clubs and that arrangements were being made for the winner of the league to face the winner of the Blue Ridge League. By November 29, Snow Hill fans had threatened legal action, requesting an injunction to prevent the league from playing any scheduled games until Snow Hill was allowed to return to the league, saying that the league's organizational meeting was held at Snow Hill's suggestion.  On December 13, it was announced that Princess Anne was dropping out of the league because it could not find an adequate location for a new ballpark at a reasonable price, and that the former ballpark at Washington High School was too small for the league. Speculation then began that Snow Hill may re-enter the league, that Princess Anne could be replaced by Milford or Dover in Delaware, or Easton, Maryland, who had been invited to the first meeting and declined, or that the league could contract and play as a six-team league for 1922, with Cambridge being mentioned as a possible contraction candidate. At a meeting on January 5, 1922 it was announced that the decision by Princess Anne to withdraw was final and the representative of the Berlin team offered to withdraw, since Berlin was the last team added to the league. The league accepted the withdrawal under the terms that if the league expanded to eight teams again, Berlin would be added back.

1922 Season
The opening game of the inaugural season was played on June 9, 1922 between the Laurel Blue Hens and Cambridge Canners in Laurel.

Cities represented

The Milford team disbanded on July 3, 1923
The Pocomoke City team disbanded on August 21, 1923

Standings & statistics

1922 to 1928 

1925 Eastern Shore Leagueschedule
No Playoffs Scheduled. Five State Championship: Hagerstown (Blue Ridge League) 4 games, Cambridge 3. 
 
1926 Eastern Shore Leagueschedule
34 Easton wins were reversed August 16; 19 Parksley wins were reversed August 22; 23 Dover Wins and 22 Cambridge wins were reversed September 2. All due to salary limit violations. Five State Championship: Hagerstown (Blue Ridge League) 4 games, Chrisfield 2. 
 
1927 Eastern Shore Leagueschedule
Five State Championship: Parksley 4 games, Chambersburg (Blue Ridge League) 2. 
 
1928 Eastern Shore Leagueschedule
The League Disbanded July 10. No Player Statistics Available.

1937 to 1941 
1937 Eastern Shore Leagueschedule
Salisbury had 21 wins reversed June 19 due to veteran player limit violationsPlayoffs: Salisbury 2 games, Cambridge 1.Centreville 2 games, Easton 1.Finals: Salisbury 3 games, Centreville 2. 
 
1938 Eastern Shore Leagueschedule
Playoffs: Salisbury 2 games, Milford 0. Cambridge 2 games, Dover 0.Finals: Salisbury 3 games, Cambridge 1. 
 
1939 Eastern Shore Leagueschedule
Playoffs: Cambridge 3 games, Centreville 0. Dover 3 games, Federalsburg 0.Finals: Cambridge 4 games, Dover 2. 
 
1940 Eastern Shore League1940 Eastern Shore League schedule
Playoffs: Milford 3 games, Dover 2. Salisbury 3 games, Centreville 2.Finals: Salisbury 4 games, Milford 2. 
 
1941 Eastern Shore Leagueschedule
Playoffs: Milford 3 games, Centreville 0. Easton 3 games, Cambridge 0.Finals: Easton 4 games, Milford 3.

1946 to 1949 
1946 Eastern Shore Leagueschedule
Playoffs: Centreville 4 games, Dover 3. Milford 4 games, Salisbury 2.Finals: Centreville 4 games, Milford 1.
 
1947 Eastern Shore Leagueschedule
Playoffs: Cambridge 4 games, Dover 3; Seaford 4 games, Federalsburg 0.Finals: Seaford 4 games, Cambridge 3. 

1948 Eastern Shore League schedule
Playoffs: Teams played a round-robin series. Cambridge (4–2). Milford (4–3). Easton (3–4). Salisbury (2–4).Finals: Milford 4 games, Cambridge 1. 
 
1949 Eastern Shore League  schedule
Playoffs: Teams played a round-robin series. Federalsburg (4–1). Rehoboth Beach (4–2). Easton (2–4). Salisbury (1–4).Finals: Rehoboth Beach 4 games, Federalsburg 3.

Notable players
Sam Frock - Laurel - 1922 Player/Manager
John Thomas Kibler - Cambridge - 1922 Player/Manager

Selected bibliography
The Eastern Shore Baseball League by William Mowbray (1989) remains the most comprehensive source for ESBL history.
Mike Lambert has published the Eastern Shore League with Arcadia Publishing in April 2010.

Sources
Baseball Reference – Eastern Shore League (D) Encyclopedia and History

References 

Caroline County, Maryland
Defunct minor baseball leagues in the United States
Baseball leagues in Delaware
Baseball leagues in Maryland
Baseball leagues in Virginia
Sports leagues established in 1922
Sports leagues disestablished in 1949